Concubine Yi (died 1 November 1736), of the Han Chinese Booi Aha of Plain Yellow Banner, was a consort of Qianlong Emperor.

Life

Family background 
Concubine Yi was a Han Chinese Booi Aha of Plain Yellow Banner by birth. Her ancestral home was in Suzhou.

Father: Daimin, a seventh rank military official in Yuanmingyuan (pinyin: qipin yuanmingyuan ewaifuzongling)

 Paternal grandfather: Fogongbao (佛公保), a fifth ranki literary official (郎中)
 Paternal uncle: Alin, a third rank military official
 Paternal aunt: Lady Li

Yongzheng era 
In 1727, Lady Huang entered the manor of Prince Bao of the First Rank, Hongli, as a mistress. She was versed in embroidery, weaving and Confucian philosophy ("Rules of a Woman", "The Principles of Self-Discipline").

Qianlong era 
After the ascension of Qianlong Emperor, Lady Huang was granted a title "Concubine Huang" (黄嫔). Her family's status was elevated from Xinzheku to middle-class booi. In October 1735, Lady Huang fell ill while Empress Xiaoxianchun, Imperial Noble Consort Huixian and other concubines visited the Tiancun Funeral Palace. Lady Huang died on 1 November 1736. She was posthumously honoured as "Concubine Yi" (仪嫔; "yi" meaning "righteous").

Titles 
 During the reign of the Kangxi Emperor (r. 1661–1722):
 Lady Huang (from unknown date)
 During the reign of the Yongzheng Emperor (r. 1722–1735):
 Mistress (from 1727)
 During the reign of the Qianlong Emperor (r. 1735–1796):
 Concubine Huang (from 1735), fifth rank consort
 Concubine Yi (from 1736)

In fiction and popular culture
 Portrayed by Xu Baihui in Story Of Yanxi palace (2017)
 Portrayed by Han Dantong in Ruyi's Royal Love in the Palace (2018)

See also
 Ranks of imperial consorts in China#Qing
 Royal and noble ranks of the Qing dynasty

References 

1736 deaths
18th-century Chinese women
Consorts of the Qianlong Emperor